Brush Creek Township is one of 37 townships in Washington County, Arkansas, USA. As of the 2010 census, its unincorporated population was 2,877.

Geography
Brush Creek Township gave some area up to Goshen Township in 1879.

Cities, towns, villages
Blue Springs Village
Pilgrim's Rest
Spring Valley
War Eagle Cove

Cemeteries
The township contains Joyce Cemetery and Morriss Cemetery.

Major routes
 U.S. Route 412
 Arkansas Highway 45 (on township line with Goshen Twp.)
 Arkansas Highway 303

References

 United States Census Bureau 2008 TIGER/Line Shapefiles
 United States National Atlas

External links
 US-Counties.com
 City-Data.com

Townships in Washington County, Arkansas
Townships in Arkansas